Kimo K. von Oelhoffen (born January 30, 1971) is a former American football defensive tackle who played in the National Football League (NFL).  He was drafted by the Cincinnati Bengals in the sixth round of the 1994 NFL Draft.  He played college football at Boise State.

He also played for the Pittsburgh Steelers, New York Jets, and Philadelphia Eagles. He won the Vince Lombardi Trophy with the Steelers in Super Bowl XL against the Seattle Seahawks.

College career
Von Oelhoffen graduated from Moloka'i High School which did not have a football team. He played one season of high school football at Moanalua High School, which is located on the Hawaiian island of Oahu, in 1985.

Von Oelhoffen started playing at the University of Hawaii, transferring to Walla Walla Community College the next year and finally settling at Boise State University.  He suffered a number of injuries in college that slowed his development including a stress fracture in his foot in 1992 and a sprained ankle in 1993.

Professional career

Cincinnati Bengals
The Cincinnati Bengals selected von Oelhoffen with the first pick of the sixth round of the 1994 NFL Draft.  In his first three seasons, he was largely a reserve, moving into the starting lineup in 1997.  The next season, von Oelhoffen became a mainstay of the defensive line, starting every game and finishing second in tackles among defensive linemen.

Pittsburgh Steelers
After a strong 1999 season, where he recorded 24 tackles and four sacks, he signed with the Pittsburgh Steelers as an unrestricted free agent on a four-year $11 million contract.  Pittsburgh initially inserted him as the starting nose tackle and converted him to defensive end.  Von Oelhoffen would start all but one game from the 2000-2005 seasons.  He won a Super Bowl ring in 2005 in his final season as a Steeler.

Carson Palmer's injury
During the 2005 Wildcard Playoff game against the Cincinnati Bengals, his former team, von Oelhoffen was involved in a controversial hit on Bengals quarterback Carson Palmer that occurred on the Bengals' second play from scrimmage and knocked Palmer out of the game with a severe knee injury. Von Oelhoffen, coming off a block set by guard Eric Steinbach, rolled into Palmer's left knee after Palmer released a pass 66 yards down field to wide receiver Chris Henry, who was also injured on the play.  The injury to Palmer was severe, including damage to his anterior cruciate ligament, medial collateral ligament, and posterior cruciate ligament. MRIs later determined that Palmer's ACL, PCL, and MCL were all torn as a result of the hit. Cincinnati fans booed von Oelhoffen after watching the replays on the Jumbotron, thinking that a flag should have been thrown for a late hit or roughing the passer. However, no flag was thrown because the hit was deemed legal at the time.
 
Von Oelhoffen later apologized publicly for the hit rather than contact Palmer directly about the incident. Though Palmer confirmed that von Oelhoffen never contacted him personally to apologize, Palmer stated that the injury was "just part of the game."

During the off-season, the NFL Rules Committee modified the rule regarding low hits on quarterbacks.  The so-called "Kimo Clause" now requires that defenders take every opportunity to avoid hitting a quarterback at or below the knees when the quarterback is in a defenseless position looking to throw with both feet on the ground.

New York Jets
For the 2006 season, von Oelhoffen signed with the New York Jets on a three-year $9.2 million deal.  He spent one season with the Jets, viewed somewhat as a disappointment given his $3.2 million signing bonus.

Philadelphia Eagles
After being released by the Jets in training camp, von Oelhoffen signed a one-year deal with the Philadelphia Eagles.  He would appear in eight games for them during that season. He was later released by the team. He has since retired from professional football.

References

External links
Pittsburgh Steelers Profile
2001 Star-Bulletin article about Von Oelhoffen

1971 births
Living people
American football defensive ends
American football defensive tackles
American people of German descent
American people of Portuguese descent
Boise State Broncos football players
Cincinnati Bengals players
Hawaii Rainbow Warriors football players
Native Hawaiian sportspeople
New York Jets players
People from Maui County, Hawaii
Philadelphia Eagles players
Pittsburgh Steelers players
Players of American football from Hawaii
Walla Walla Warriors football players